Sir William Trelawny, 6th Baronet (c. 1722 – 11 December 1772), of Trelawne, Cornwall was a British politician and colonial administrator.

He was the son of Captain William Trelawny, R.N. and educated at Westminster School. He succeeded his uncle Sir Harry Trelawny, 5th Baronet to the baronetcy in 1762, inheriting the Trelawne estate.

Trelawny sat as Member of Parliament for West Looe from 1757 to 1767. The latter year he was appointed Governor of Jamaica, a post he held until his death in December 1772.  Trelawny Parish, Jamaica was named after him.

He died in Jamaica in 1772. He had married his cousin Laetitia, the daughter and heiress of Sir Harry Trelawny, 5th Baronet, with whom he had a son and a daughter.

References

1720s births
1772 deaths
People educated at Westminster School, London
Baronets in the Baronetage of England
Members of the Parliament of Great Britain for West Looe
British MPs 1754–1761
British MPs 1761–1768
Governors of Jamaica